Bernard Szajner is a French composer, musical theorist, visual artist. He is credited with the invention of the laser harp, which he patented.

Early life 
Szajner was born in Grenoble, France on 27 June 1944, into a family of Polish Jews who had been exiled due to the rise of Naziism and anti-semitism in Poland. He was given the name "Wolf" and spent his earlier times hidden in a cellar. During his childhood, he'd heard of the stories of his uncle who had been sent to Auschwitz concentration camp and had disappeared. His experience would go on to influence his musical composition later in life.

Musical and artistic career 
Between 1979 and 1983, Szajner released five albums of innovative and Avant-garde electronic music. He became renowned as a light and visual effects technician with artists such as Magma, Gong, Stomu Yamashta and The Who.

During the 1970s, he became a pioneer in the field of using laser technology as an artistic tool. As a measure of his success, he became renowned by his work with companies such as Cartier and Renault. In 1980, inspired by the novel, Nova, by Samuel R. Delany, he first created the laser harp. The laser harp became so successful that Jean-Michel Jarre ordered a version from Bernard Szajner for his tour of China. Despite all this, Szajner would only occasionally use this instrument in his own performances. He has stated that he would rather the public not know him solely for his work on the laser harp, and that it not be allowed to take precedence over his work in musical composition that it enables. This is also why he continues to develop other instruments which use other innovative methods of interaction, such as tactile or holographic.

Towards the end of the 1980s and disgusted with the music industry, he chose to abandon music entirely, and shifted his focus towards digital and visual arts, and theatre.

Discography 
 1979, Visions of Dune, Pathé/EMI
 His first album was inspired by the novel, Dune, by Frank Herbert and introduced musicians such as Hahn Rowe and Klaus Blasquiz.
 1980, Some Deaths Take Forever, Pathé/EMI
 Inspired by the experiences of two prisoners on Death Row, part of this album was used as a soundtrack to a short film by Amnesty International. Klaus Blasquiz and Bernard Paganotti also collaborated on this work.
 1981, Superficial Music, IRC
 1981, Back to the Burner / Back to Siberia, Epic
 1982, Wallenberg, Hypothetical records
 1983, Around the World, Epic
 1983, Brute Reason, Island Record
 1984, The Big Scare, New Rose
 1986, Indécent Délit, New Rose

Performances 
 1981, Laser Harp performance at the Festival of Science-Fiction and Imagination, Metz
 2012, No Concert or C-Tunes, a collaboration with Yro
 2013, The Conference of the Birds, a further collaboration with Yro

References

External links 
 

1944 births
French electronic musicians
Living people
Musicians from Grenoble